Arslan Giray (reigned 1748–1756 and 1767, lived 1692–1768) was twice khan of the Crimean khanate. He was the second son of Devlet II Giray (1699). His son was Devlet IV Giray (1769) and his grandson was the historian Halim Giray. Two of his brothers were khans (Fetih II Giray (1736) and Qırım Giray (1758)). He was said to be noble, brave and respected by his subjects. His name means 'lion'.

In 1735–36 he was nureddin under his uncle Qaplan I Giray at the time of the first Russian invasion. In 1736–37 he was kalga under his brother Fetih II Giray at the time of the second Russian invasion. The next khans were 1737: Meñli II Giray, 1740 Selâmet II Giray, 1743: Selim II Giray.

First reign 1748–1756
He was enthroned in May/June 1748. His kalga was Selim, a son of Fetih II. His nureddin was his brother and future khan Qırım Giray.  Qirim was later replaced by Maksud, a son of Selyamet II. 

He continued to rebuild Crimea following the Russian invasions of 1736–1738.  He added a west wing to his palace, strengthened Perekop, Arabat and other forts and built mosques, madrasas and public fountains. 

Russia had now advanced far enough south to threaten both Crimea and Turkey. Russia pressed Turkey to press Crimea to hold down border raids. The reduction of raiding probably reduced Crimean incomes. He gained control over unruly members of the Giray clan by giving them honorable posts in Crimea. The Ottomans praised him for keeping peace with Poland and Russia.

In February/March 1756 the lost the throne, possibly due to intrigues in Istanbul.

1756–1767
The next khans were 1756: Halim Giray, 1758: Qırım Giray and 1765: Selim III Giray.  In 1758 Arslan was called to replace Halim, but the Crimeans opposed this and Qirim was chosen instead.

Second reign and death (1767)
He was appointed khan, apparently in Istanbul. He appointed as kalga the future khan Devlet IV Gray. Three months later, on his way to Crimea, he died near Căușeni in Moldavia.  His coffin was taken to Bakhchisarai and buried there

Sources
Henry Hoyle Howorth, History of the Mongols, 1880, Part 2, pp 582-583.
Smirnov, Krimskoye Khanstvo b XVIII Beke, 1887, Chapter 4 paragraphs 10 through 18 http://www.krimoved-library.ru/books/krimskoe-hanstvo-v-xviii-veke4.html (in Russian)

Crimean Khans
18th-century rulers in Europe